Anneri Ebersohn (born 9 August 1990) is a South African athlete specialising in the 400 metres hurdles. She represented her country at the 2013 World Championships in Moscow, failing to reach the semifinals.

Her personal best in the event is 55.87, set in Potchefstroom in 2013.

Competition record

References

1990 births
Living people
South African female hurdlers
Universiade medalists in athletics (track and field)
University of Pretoria alumni
Universiade bronze medalists for South Africa
Medalists at the 2013 Summer Universiade
Competitors at the 2015 Summer Universiade
Athletes (track and field) at the 2015 African Games
African Games competitors for South Africa
20th-century South African women
21st-century South African women